Hans Kantor (born 1903, date of death unknown) was an Austrian long-distance runner. He competed in the men's 5000 metres at the 1924 Summer Olympics.

References

External links
 

1903 births
Year of death missing
Athletes (track and field) at the 1924 Summer Olympics
Austrian male long-distance runners
Olympic athletes of Austria
Place of birth missing